Maasin, officially the Municipality of Maasin,  is a 3rd class municipality in the province of Iloilo, Philippines. According to the 2020 census, it has a population of 38,461 people.

Geography

Barangays
Maasin is politically subdivided into 50 barangays.

Climate

Demographics

Economy

References

External links
 [ Philippine Standard Geographic Code]
 Philippine Census Information
 Local Governance Performance Management System

Municipalities of Iloilo